Doug Wayne Gwosdz (born June 20, 1960), nicknamed "Eyechart", is an American former professional baseball catcher.

Gwosdz played during four seasons at the Major League Baseball (MLB) for the San Diego Padres. He was drafted by the Padres in the 2nd round of the 1978 MLB draft.

References

External links
, or Retrosheet

1960 births
Living people
Amarillo Gold Sox players
American expatriate baseball players in Canada
American people of Polish descent
Baseball players from Texas
Calgary Cannons players
Hawaii Islanders players
Jackson Mets players
Las Vegas Stars (baseball) players
Major League Baseball catchers
Nashville Sounds players
Phoenix Giants players
Reno Silver Sox players
San Diego Padres players
Tidewater Tides players
Tigres de Aragua players
American expatriate baseball players in Venezuela
Walla Walla Padres players